Thomas Gilchrist (born 29 December 1895) was a Scottish footballer who played for Third Lanark, Heart of Midlothian, Rangers (two spells, though no appearances in the second having signed up for military service in World War I), Kilmarnock, Motherwell, Dumbarton, King's Park, Bo'ness and Clackmannan, mainly as an inside right.

References

1895 births
Year of death missing
Scottish footballers
Dumbarton F.C. players
Rangers F.C. players
Kilmarnock F.C. players
Motherwell F.C. players
Heart of Midlothian F.C. players
Scottish Football League players
Third Lanark A.C. players
Glasgow United F.C. players
Bo'ness F.C. players
King's Park F.C. players
Clackmannan F.C. players
Association football inside forwards
Scottish Junior Football Association players
Footballers from South Lanarkshire
British military personnel of World War I
Sportspeople from Larkhall